Captain Blomet (French: Capitaine Blomet) is a 1947 French comedy film directed by Andrée Feix and starring Fernand Gravey, Gaby Sylvia and Jean Meyer. The film's sets were designed by the art director Jacques Krauss.

Cast
 Fernand Gravey as Blomet 
 Gaby Sylvia as Micheline de Mandane 
 Jean Meyer as Justin  
 Henri Crémieux as Le premier témoin de Cugnac  
 Made Siamé as Mme de Guérinière  
 Jacques Tarride 
 Denise Precheur 
 Ariane Murator 
 Etienne Decroux
 Pierre Vernet 
 Colette Fleuriot 
 Suzanne Flon 
 Jean Gold 
 Jacques Henley 
 Katherine Kath 
 Jacques Erwin as M. de Cugnac  
 Jean-Roger Caussimon as Clodomir 
 Jacques Castelot as Rodolphe
 Jean d'Yd 
 Zita Fiore 
 Frédérique Nadar 
 Marcelle Praince

References

Bibliography 
 Tim Palmer & Charlie Michael. Directory of World Cinema: France. Intellect Books, 2013.

External links 
 

1947 films
1947 comedy films
French comedy films
1940s French-language films
Films directed by Andrée Feix
French black-and-white films
1940s French films